Vande Mataram is a 1985 Indian Telugu-language film written and directed by T. Krishna, and produced Krishna Chitra. It stars Vijayashanti and  Rajasekhar, with music composed by Chakravarthy. The film is the debut of actor Rajasekhar into the Telugu film industry.

The popular song Vandemataram in the film, written by C. Narayana Reddy was first written much earlier, published in a magazine, made popular by singers of Praja Natya Mandali. The singer Srinivas who sang the song was later called Vandemataram Srinivas. The film won two Nandi Awards.

Cast

 Vijayashanti as Shanthi 
 Dr. Rajashekar as Satyam
 Rajendra Prasad as Dr.G. N. Kal /Nukaal
 Kota Srinivasa Rao as Govindaiah
 Suthi Veerabhadra Rao 
 Suthi Velu as Lakchanna
 Sakshi Ranga Rao as Brahmaiah
 P. L. Narayana as Manikyam
 Narra Venkateswara Rao as Eeswaraiah
 Saikumar
 Saichand as Maridaiah
 Benerjee  
 Ramaraju
 Bhimeswara Rao as Bhushanam
 Chitti Babu as Papaiah
 Ramana Reddy 
 Pushpa Kumari
 Dubbing Janaki as Mahalakshmi
 Lakshmi Priya
 Shaheeda 
 Bindu Madhavi 
 Devi as Seetalu
 Vaani as Kamalamma
 Nirmalamma as Satyam's grandmother
 Jayamalini as item number
 Anuradha as item number

Soundtrack

Music composed by Chakravarthy. Lyrics were written by C. Narayana Reddy, Dasam Gopalakrishna (Allatappa) and Adrushta Deepak (Naa Peru Palleturu). Music released on AVM Audio Company.

Awards
Nandi Awards
Third Best Feature Film - Bronze - Y. Anil Babu
Best Supporting Actor - Suthivelu

References

External links
 

1980s Telugu-language films
1985 films
Films directed by T. Krishna